Purple Line of the Pune Metro is the first line of the city's mass transit network. It runs from PCMC Bhavan to Swargate. The  line will be elevated till Range Hills with 9 stations and will further go underground up to Swargate with 5 stations.

Route 
The line will go via Kasarwadi (Nashik Phata), Khadki and Shivajinagar. The maintenance depot for the Purple Line will be located near the Range Hills station on the land acquired from the College of Agriculture.

Construction 
Soil testing and topographical surveys of the concerned areas started in late December 2016. Excavation work for erection of pillars started in early June, 2017. The construction of the first pillar was completed by October 2017 and construction work of up to ten pillars was underway. The first viaduct was completely erected by January 2018. The first batch of tracks were laid between PCMC and Sant Tukaram Nagar in the second week of July 2019.

List of Stations
Following is a list of stations on this route-

References 

Pune Metro lines